Pernambuco is a Brazilian state.

Pernambuco can also refer to the following :

 Places and jurisdictions
 Captaincy of Pernambuco, or New Lusitania, a hereditary land grant and colonial administrative subdivision of northern Portuguese Brazil
 the former Latin Catholic Territorial Prelature of Pernambuco, now Metropolitan Archdiocese of Olinda e Recife

 Other
 Paubrasilia echinata, a timber tree which produces wood known as Pernambuco
 , a cargo ship called MV Pernambuco from 1928 to 1945
 Pernambuco (footballer) (born 1998), a Brazilian football player, full name José Vitor Rodrigues da Silva dos Santos
 "Pernambuco", an instrumental guitar piece composed by Luiz Bonfá